In enzymology, a 3-carboxy-cis,cis-muconate cycloisomerase is an enzyme that catalyzes the chemical reaction

2-carboxy-2,5-dihydro-5-oxofuran-2-acetate  cis,cis-butadiene-1,2,4-tricarboxylate

Hence, this enzyme has one substrate, 2-carboxy-2,5-dihydro-5-oxofuran-2-acetate, and one product, cis,cis-butadiene-1,2,4-tricarboxylate.

This enzyme belongs to the family of isomerases, specifically intramolecular lyases.  The systematic name of this enzyme class is 2-carboxy-2,5-dihydro-5-oxofuran-2-acetate lyase (decyclizing). Other names in common use include beta-carboxymuconate lactonizing enzyme, and 3-carboxymuconolactone hydrolase.  This enzyme participates in benzoate degradation via hydroxylation.

Structural studies

As of late 2007, only one structure has been solved for this class of enzymes, with the PDB accession code .

References 

 
 

EC 5.5.1
Enzymes of known structure